Zelevizhdë is a village in the former municipality of Lumas in Berat County, Albania. At the 2015 local government reform it became part of the municipality Kuçovë.

References

Populated places in Kuçovë
Villages in Berat County